La Cienega Boulevard is a major north–south arterial road that runs between El Segundo Boulevard in Hawthorne, California on the south and the Sunset Strip/Sunset Boulevard in West Hollywood to the north. It was named for Rancho Las Cienegas, literally "The Ranch Of The Swamps," an area of marshland south of Rancho La Brea.

Route description
From south of Fairview Boulevard and from north of Obama Boulevard (formerly Rodeo Road) La Cienega Boulevard is a regular surface street and one of Hollywood's major thoroughfares.  Offices for A&E Network, The History Channel and the Academy of Motion Picture Arts and Sciences are located on La Cienega as were the studios of Citadel Broadcasting flagships KABC and KLOS, two of Los Angeles' biggest radio stations, which were demolished for an apartment and shopping complex, currently under construction. A portion of La Cienega in and adjacent to Beverly Hills is known as "Restaurant Row" for its large number of upscale restaurants.  South of Olympic, La Cienega through between the Pico-Robertson and South Carthay neighborhoods in West Los Angeles and through the Crestview neighborhood in West Los Angeles into Culver City and is known for its large number of automotive-related business including several used car dealerships and many body shops and auto mechanics.

It continues south passing Interstate 10, and the Metro Expo Line. 

It is unusual among Southern California roadways to be built to freeway standards. South of Interstate 10, La Cienega was built to freeway standards in the late 1940s as part of the proposed Laurel Canyon Freeway, part of State Route 170.  The SR 170 freeway was never completed south of U.S. Route 101, and the stretch of La Cienega from just north of Fairview Blvd in Inglewood, through Baldwin Hills and along the Kenneth Hahn State Recreation Area to Obama Boulevard in Los Angeles is a divided, limited access highway with few traffic signals.  As such, emergency call boxes like those found along the area's freeways were installed along that stretch in the early 1970s.

South of Fairview Blvd, La Cienega runs parallel to the 405 freeway and terminates at El Segundo Boulevard in Del Aire along the west side of the freeway. A non-contiguous segment also named La Cienega Blvd runs along the East side of the 405 freeway roughly between El Segundo Blvd and Rosecrans Avenue in the section of Hawthorne also known as Wiseburn, another unincorporated area adjacent to Del Aire. If you look where it curves into 142nd street, the street sign is mislabeled E 142nd street, which is one block north of Rosecrans 

Many years ago, the south end of La Cienega was Anza Avenue.

La Cienega Design Quarter
The area of La Cienega Boulevard, from Beverly Boulevard to Santa Monica Boulevard, and its satellite streets is known as the La Cienega Design Quarter. Its shops and galleries house many antiques, furniture, rugs, accessories and art. Art dealer Felix Landau operated his trend-setting gallery there in the 1960s.

Restaurant Row

La Cienega in Beverly Hills, north of Wilshire Boulevard, is known as Restaurant Row because it features many upscale restaurants. From Wilshire in Beverly Hills traveling north the best known establishments include Benihana, The Stinking Rose, Darioush, the original Lawry's the Prime Rib, Hakobe, Tokyo Table - Tokyo City Cuisine, Matsuhisa, Fogo de Chão, Gyu-Kaku, Woo Lae Oak, The Bazaar by José Andrés, and Morton's.

Etymology
La Cienega Boulevard is named after Rancho Las Cienegas Mexican land grant roughly in the region now called "West Los Angeles." The Spanish phrase la ciénaga translates into English as "the swamp" and the area named "Las Ciénegas" was a continual marshland due to the course of the Los Angeles River through that area prior to a massive southerly shift in 1825 to roughly its present course. The difference in spelling in Los Angeles between the Castilian Spanish word ciénaga and the name of the thoroughfare, which is common in other Iberian languages like Extremaduran, originated with the name of the ranch.

Transportation
Metro Local lines 105 runs on La Cienega Boulevard. An elevated light rail station for the Metro E Line is located at Jefferson Boulevard. An underground station for the Metro D Line at Wilshire Boulevard is currently under construction and is due to open in 2023.

Major intersections

References

External links

Southern California Unsigned Freeways – La Cienega Boulevard
La Cienega Design Quarter

Streets in Los Angeles
Streets in Los Angeles County, California
Boulevards in the United States
Southern California freeways
Central Los Angeles
South Los Angeles
Baldwin Hills (mountain range)
Inglewood, California
Streets in West Hollywood, California
Restaurant districts and streets in the United States
West Los Angeles
Westside (Los Angeles County)